Joseph McNamara may refer to:

 Joseph McNamara (Ontario politician) (1888–?)
 Joseph McNamara (Rhode Island politician) (born 1950), member of the Rhode Island House of Representatives
 Joseph McNamara (Virginia politician) (born 1963), member of the Virginia House of Delegates
 Joseph A. McNamara (1892–1972), Vermont attorney and politician
 Joseph D. McNamara (1935–2014), police chief of Kansas City, Missouri, and San Jose, California
 Joe McNamara, property developer and protester in Ireland
 Kevin McNamara (politician) (Joseph Kevin McNamara, 1934–2017), British Labour Party politician